Sam's Town Las Vegas is a hotel and casino located in Sunrise Manor, Nevada on the corner of Flamingo Road and Boulder Highway. It is one of the casinos owned and operated by Boyd Gaming. It features a 25,000-square-foot indoor park, bowling center, movie theater, and one of the largest casino floors in Las Vegas.

One of the unique features of the hotel is "Mystic Falls Park", a large glass-roofed atrium with tall live trees, cobblestone paths, and a waterfall in the center where Sunset Stampede Laser Light and Water Show is performed several times a day.

It was the host hotel for the Sam's Town 300, a NASCAR race sponsored by Sam's Town. It was also the Las Vegas host hotel for the Silver State Classic Challenge race.

History
The original Sam's Town opened on April 1, 1979 and it was one of the first locals casinos to open in the Las Vegas Valley. Over the next 21 years, Sam's Town would undergo eight expansions. In 1994, its original hotel rooms were demolished for an expansion which added a high-rise tower with 650 rooms, along with Mystic Falls.

An $86 million renovation and expansion project took place in 2000, toning down the property's country theme while adding more casino space, a buffet, a pool, and a parking garage. The project also added an 18-screen Century Theatres facility, and a 1,050-seat showroom known as Sam's Town Live.

Sam's Town is part of the Boulder Strip.

From 1980 to 1999 the studios of Nevada Public Radio were located in a separate building on the property.

The 2006 album Sam's Town by The Killers was named after the casino.

References

External links

 

1979 establishments in Nevada
Boyd Gaming
Buildings and structures in Sunrise Manor, Nevada
Casinos in the Las Vegas Valley
Landmarks in Nevada
Hotels established in 1979
Skyscraper hotels in the Las Vegas Valley